Jack Linn (June 10, 1967 – September 6, 2015) was a professional American football player who played offensive lineman for three seasons for the Indianapolis Colts, Detroit Lions, and Cincinnati Bengals. He played in 11 games.

Linn was killed in a motorcycle crash on September 6, 2015. Investigators say Linn missed a stop sign and hit an oncoming vehicle. His passenger was also killed.

References

1967 births
2015 deaths
Freedom High School (Pennsylvania) alumni
American football offensive linemen
Indianapolis Colts players
Cincinnati Bengals players
Detroit Lions players
West Virginia Mountaineers football players
People from Sewickley, Pennsylvania
Players of American football from Pennsylvania
Road incident deaths in Florida
Sportspeople from Northampton County, Pennsylvania
Motorcycle road incident deaths